Richard Brompton (1734-1783) was an English portrait painter.

Life
Brompton was a pupil of Benjamin Wilson. He then went to Italy, and spent some time in Rome, where he had lessons with Raphael Mengs. He was also introduced to the patronage of the Earl of Northampton, and  accompanied the earl to Venice when he was appointed ambassador to the republic. At Venice Brompton painted a conversation-piece, in which he introduced the portraits of the Duke of York and several English gentlemen then on their travels. The picture was afterwards exhibited at the rooms in Spring Gardens in 1763, at which time he returned to England, and for some years practised portrait painting. Extravagant living and debtors brought him to the King's Bench, but he was rescued by the Empress of Russia, at whose request he went to St. Petersburg, where he was appointed portrait painter to the empress, and where he met with much employment. During this time he was patronized by the empress favorite, Grigory Potemkin. He died in that city in 1783.

Among his best works are:

The Prince of Wales in the Robes of the Garter, in 1772; mezzotinted by John Saunders.
Prince Frederick in the Robes of the Bath; mezzotinted by John Saunders.
William Pitt, 1st Earl of Chatham, 1772
Admiral Saunders; in the Old Royal Naval College, formerly Greenwich Hospital]] (pictured)

References

Further reading
 
Attribution

External links

 

1734 births
1783 deaths
English portrait painters
People imprisoned for debt